Party room may refer to:
Party room, an Australian term for a parliamentary group
A venue where a party takes place